Taste of China is a 2015 Chinese documentary film directed by Huang Yinghao, Zhang Wei, Wang Bing and Jin Ying. It was released on January 23, 2015.

Cast
Yang Zhenhua
Chen Hanzong
Chen Junfan
Mao Xiejun
You Qiang

Reception
By January 23, the film had earned  at the Chinese box office.

References

2015 documentary films
Chinese documentary films
2010s Mandarin-language films